{{DISPLAYTITLE:C16H24N2}}
The molecular formula C16H24N2 (molar mass: 244.37 g/mol, exact mass: 244.193949) may refer to:

 Diisopropyltryptamine, a psychedelic hallucinogenic drug
 Dipropyltryptamine
 Isoaminile
 Propylisopropyltryptamine
 Xylometazoline

Molecular formulas